This is a list of notable Bangladeshi Engineers.

F 
 Fazlur Rahman Khan

I 
 Iqbal Mahmud

J 
 Jamilur Reza Choudhury

K 
 Khondkar Siddique-e-Rabbani

M 
 Muhammad M. Hussain
 M. Rezwan Khan
 Mahmudur Rahman
 Muhammad Shahid Sarwar

S 
 Sunny Sanwar
 Md Sanwar Hossain

 
engineers